Season twenty-eight of the American reality competition series Dancing with the Stars premiered on September 16, 2019 on ABC.

On November 25, The Bachelorette star Hannah Brown and Alan Bersten were announced the winners, while actor and comedian Kel Mitchell and Witney Carson finished in second place, singer Ally Brooke and Sasha Farber finished in third place, and singer Lauren Alaina and Gleb Savchenko finished in fourth.

This marked the last season for co-hosts Tom Bergeron and Erin Andrews.

Cast

Couples
For the first time, the couples were not announced in advance, but were revealed during the season premiere. On August 19, 2019, Peta Murgatroyd announced that she would be returning as a professional. On August 21, the cast was revealed on Good Morning America. Artem Chigvintsev and Sharna Burgess did not return for this season. Two new dancers, Daniella Karagach and Pasha Pashkov, were added to the pro line-up.

There was no dance troupe this season.

On September 16, it was announced that Christie Brinkley had to withdraw from the competition due to an injury sustained during rehearsal. Her daughter, Sailor Brinkley-Cook, took her place.

Hosts and judges
Tom Bergeron and Erin Andrews returned as hosts, while Carrie Ann Inaba, Len Goodman, and Bruno Tonioli, returned as judges.

Scoring charts

Notes

 : The couples were scored on a 40-point scale due to the presence of a guest judge.
 : This was the lowest score of the week.
 : This was the highest score of the week.
 :  This couple finished in first place.
 :  This couple finished in second place.
 :  This couple finished in third place.
 :  This couple finished in fourth place.
 :  This couple withdrew from the competition.
 :  This couple was in the bottom two, but was not eliminated. 
 :  This couple was eliminated.

Highest and lowest scoring performances
The best and worst performances in each dance according to the judges' 30-point scale are as follows. Scores from guest judges are not included.

Couples' highest and lowest scoring dances
Scores are based upon a potential 30-point maximum. Scores from guest judges are not included.

Weekly scores
Individual judges' scores in the charts below (given in parentheses) are listed in this order from left to right: Carrie Ann Inaba, Len Goodman, Bruno Tonioli.

Week 1: First Dances
The couples danced the cha-cha-cha, foxtrot, salsa or tango. Couples are listed in the order they performed.

For the first time in the show's history, the official partnerships were revealed to the public during the live broadcast.

Week 2: First Elimination
The couples danced one unlearned dance. The paso doble, quickstep, rumba, samba and Viennese waltz were introduced. Couples are listed in the order they performed.

Two new format changes were introduced for the remainder of the season: live voting during the broadcast (only available to viewers in the Central and Eastern time zones), and a judges' save for one of the bottom two couples.

Judges' votes to save
Carrie Ann: Mary & Brandon
Bruno: Ray & Cheryl
Len: Ray & Cheryl

Week 3: Movie Night
The couples performed one unlearned dance to famous film songs. The jive was introduced. Couples are listed in the order they performed.

At the beginning of the show, it was announced that Ray Lewis had withdrawn from the competition due to an injury sustained in rehearsals. His dance partner, Cheryl Burke, performed their routine during the live show with season 24 winner Rashad Jennings as a stand-in. There was no additional elimination.

Week 4: Cast From The Past
Individual judges' scores in the chart below (given in parentheses) are listed in this order from left to right: Carrie Ann Inaba, Leah Remini, Len Goodman, Bruno Tonioli.

The couples performed one unlearned dance. The Argentine tango was introduced. Couples are listed in the order they performed.

Season 17 contestant Leah Remini served as a guest judge for this week.

Judges' votes to save
 Carrie Ann: Karamo & Jenna
 Bruno: Karamo & Jenna
 Len: Did not vote, but would have voted to save Karamo & Jenna

Week 5: Disney Night
The couples performed one unlearned dance to songs from Disney films; contemporary and jazz were introduced. No elimination took place this week. Couples are listed in the order they performed.

Week 6: Top 9
The couples performed one unlearned dance. Couples are listed in the order they performed.

Judges' votes to save
 Carrie Ann: Ally & Sasha
 Bruno: Ally & Sasha
 Len: Did not vote

Week 7: Halloween Night
The couples performed one unlearned dance and a team dance. Couples are listed in the order they performed.

Judges' votes to save
 Carrie Ann: Karamo & Jenna
 Bruno: Kate & Pasha
 Len: Kate & Pasha

Week 8: Dance-Off Week
The couples performed one unlearned dance and participated in paired dance-offs for extra points. Due to being on top of the previous week's leader board and holding the highest average of the season this far, James & Emma earned immunity from competing in the dance-off and automatically received two bonus points. Couples are listed in the order they performed.

Sean Spicer performed with Jenna Johnson this week. 

Judges' votes to save
 Carrie Ann: Ally & Sasha
 Bruno: Ally & Sasha
 Len: Did not vote, but would have voted to save Ally & Sasha

Week 9: Boy Band & Girl Group Night
Individual judges' scores in the chart below (given in parentheses) are listed in this order from left to right: Carrie Ann Inaba, Len Goodman, Joey Fatone, Bruno Tonioli.

The couples performed two unlearned dances to songs from famous girl groups (the first round) and boy bands (the second round). Couples are listed in the order they performed.

NSYNC member Joey Fatone, who competed on both season 4 and season 15, served as a guest judge for the week.

For the second consecutive week, Sean Spicer performed with Jenna Johnson.

Judges' votes to save
 Carrie Ann: Lauren & Gleb
 Bruno: Lauren & Gleb
 Len: Did not vote

Week 10: Semifinals
During the first round, the couples performed a redemption dance to a new song that was coached by one of the three judges. In the second round, they performed one unlearned dance. The Charleston was introduced. Couples are listed in the order they performed.

Judges' votes to save
 Carrie Ann: Ally & Sasha
 Bruno: Ally & Sasha
 Len: Did not vote, but would have voted to save Ally & Sasha

Week 11: Finale
The couples performed their favorite dance of the season and a freestyle routine. Couples are listed in the order they performed.

Dance chart 
The celebrities and professional partners danced one of these routines for each corresponding week:
 Week 1 (First Dances): One unlearned dance
 Week 2 (First Elimination): One unlearned dance
 Week 3 (Movie Night): One unlearned dance
 Week 4 (Top 10): One unlearned dance
 Week 5 (Disney Night): One unlearned dance
 Week 6 (Top 9): One unlearned dance
 Week 7 (Halloween Night): One unlearned dance & team dance
 Week 8 (Dance-Off Week): One unlearned dance & dance-off
 Week 9 (Boy Band & Girl Group Night): Two unlearned dances
 Week 10 (Semifinals): Redemption dance & one unlearned dance
 Week 11 (Finale): Favorite dance & freestyle

Notes

 :  This was the highest scoring dance of the week.
 :  This was the lowest scoring dance of the week.
 :  This couple gained bonus points for winning this dance-off.
 :  This couple gained no bonus points for losing this dance-off.
 :  This couple was immune from having to compete in the dance-off.

Ratings

References

External links

2019 American television seasons
Dancing with the Stars (American TV series)